"That's the Way It Goes" is a song written by Kerry Chater, Lynn Gillespie Chater, and Cyril Rawson and performed by Anne Murray.  The song reached #19 on the Canadian Adult Contemporary chart in 1997. The song appeared on her 1996 album, Anne Murray.

Chart performance

Anne Murray

References

1997 singles
Songs written by Kerry Chater
Anne Murray songs
1996 songs